Tagelus is a genus of saltwater clams, marine bivalve molluscs belonging to the family Solecurtidae.

Species
 Tagelus adansonii (Bosc, 1801)
 Tagelus affinis (C. B. Adams, 1852)
 Tagelus californianus (Conrad, 1837)
 Tagelus divisus (Spengler, 1794)
 Tagelus dombeii (Lamarck, 1818)
 Tagelus longisinuatus Pilsbry & Lowe, 1932
 Tagelus peruanus (Dunker, 1862)
 Tagelus peruvianus Pilsbry & Olsson, 1941
 Tagelus plebeius (Lightfoot, 1786)
 Tagelus politus (Carpenter, 1857)
 Tagelus subteres (Conrad, 1837)

References

Coan, E. V.; Valentich-Scott, P. (2012). Bivalve seashells of tropical West America. Marine bivalve mollusks from Baja California to northern Peru. 2 vols, 1258 pp.

Solecurtidae
Bivalve genera
Taxa named by John Edward Gray